Alberto Orlando (born 27 September 1938) is an Italian former footballer who played at both professional and international levels as a forward. Although not gifted with the best technical ability, he was a fast, physical, energetic, opportunistic, and powerful player, who was good in the air; he often played on the wing or through the centre of the pitch.

Club career
Born in Rome, Orlando played for Roma, Messina (briefly on a season loan from Roma), Fiorentina, Torino, Napoli and SPAL 1907 throughout his career. He is mostly remembered for his seven-year club career with Roma, the team with which he won the 1960–61 Inter-Cities Fairs Cup, and the 1963–64 Coppa Italia, forming a formidable partnership with Giampaolo Menichelli. In total, he managed 142 Serie A appearances and 34 goals in Serie A with Roma. During his time at Roma, he was briefly loaned to Serie B side Messina during the 1958–59 season, scoring 17 goals in 30 appearances. After leaving Roma, he moved to Fiorentina, where he also achieved notable success. He became the Serie A top scorer during the 1964–65 season, alongside scudetto winner Sandro Mazzola, and he helped the club to a fourth-place finish in the league. That season, he also helped Fiorentina to reach the final of the 1965 Mitropa Cup. Orlando spent his final season with Serie B side SPAL, making 6 appearances, before retiring in 1969.

International career
Orlando represented the Italian national team between 1962 and 1965, making 5 appearances, and scoring 4 goals. After his notable and positive successful performances with Roma, he made his international debut against Turkey, on 2 December 1962, in Bologna, in a UEFA Euro 1964 qualifying match. Orlando scored all 4 of his international goals in Italy's 6–0 victory. He also appeared in the return leg, where he suffered a temporary injury.

Career statistics

International goals 
Source

Honours

Club
Roma
Inter-Cities Fairs Cup: 1960–61	
Coppa Italia: 1963–64

Individual
Serie A Top scorer: 1964–65

References

External links
 Enciclopedia del Calcio

1938 births
Living people
Italian footballers
Italy international footballers
Torino F.C. players
A.S. Roma players
S.P.A.L. players
ACF Fiorentina players
S.S.C. Napoli players
A.C.R. Messina players
Footballers from Rome
Serie A players
Serie B players
Association football forwards